Friends at the Table is an actual play indie podcast hosted by Austin Walker. The podcast has been active since September 2014, and episodes are released weekly. The collaboration between the gamemaster and the players is a major component of the show, in contrast to many tabletop role-playing games where the gamemaster has total control over worldbuilding.

Production 
The show is an actual play podcast, but due to its heavy editing, the show is similar in presentation to a radio drama or audiobook. Players on the show contribute to the worldbuilding more than in many tabletop role-playing games, where worldbuilding is often left to the gamemaster. The show has been producing episodes since September 2014, and releases episodes on a weekly basis.

Cast 
 Austin Walker (gamemaster)
 Art Martinez-Tebbel
 Alicia Acampora (editor, producer)
 Jack de Quidt (composer)
 Sylvia Clare
 Janine Hawkins
 Keith J. Carberry (editor, producer)
 Andrew Lee Swan
 Nick Scratch

Campaigns and seasons 
The show is split across two feeds: the main feed, which is accessible for free on the website and on podcast platforms, and a paid feed via Patreon. The main feed includes weekly episodes, which are split into seasons. The end of a season is marked with a "post mortem" episode, where the cast answers questions about the season.

Seasons one and two of the show were based on Apocalypse World. According to Walker, he drew inspiration for season six from Mobile Suit Gundam Thunderbolt, Code Geass, Legend of the Galactic Heroes, Aldnoah.Zero, and Mobile Suit Gundam: The 08th MS Team. Various other seasons of the show have drawn elements from many different tabletop role-playing systems, including Dungeon World.

The Patreon feed consists of one main campaign (Bluff City) along other show formats and extras.

Reception 
According to Chase Carter, the podcast had more than 3,929 Patreon supporters in July 2021. The show was featured on iTunes. Dan Neilan wrote in The A.V. Club that it is an "intimidating podcast to jump into" and a "bit overwhelming," but despite this the story had "rich, complex lore."

Awards

See also 
 List of fantasy podcasts
 List of Dungeons & Dragons web series

References

External links 
 

2014 podcast debuts
Audio podcasts
Actual play podcasts
Patreon creators